Schloss Ehrenhausen is a castle in Ehrenhausen, a municipality in the South of the Austrian province of Styria. Schloss Ehrenhausen is situated at an elevation of 297 m.

See also
List of castles in Austria

References

This article was initially translated from the German Wikipedia.

Castles in Styria